A structure chart (SC) in software engineering and organizational theory is a chart which shows the breakdown of a system to its lowest manageable levels. They are used in structured programming to arrange program modules into a tree. Each module is represented by a box, which contains the module's name. The tree structure visualizes the relationships between modules.

Overview 

A structure chart is a top-down modular design tool, constructed of squares representing the different modules in the system, and lines that connect them. The lines represent the connection and or ownership between activities and subactivities as they are used in organization charts.

In structured analysis structure charts, according to Wolber (2009), "are used to specify the high-level design, or architecture, of a computer program. As a design tool, they aid the programmer in dividing and conquering a large software problem, that is, recursively breaking a problem down into parts that are small enough to be understood by a human brain. The process is called top-down design, or functional decomposition. Programmers use a structure chart to build a program in a manner similar to how an architect uses a blueprint to build a house. In the design stage, the chart is drawn and used as a way for the client and the various software designers to communicate. During the actual building of the program (implementation), the chart is continually referred to as "the master-plan".

A structure chart depicts
 the size and complexity of the system, and
 number of readily identifiable functions and modules within each function and
 whether each identifiable function is a manageable entity or should be broken down into smaller components.

A structure chart is also used to diagram associated elements that comprise a run stream or thread. It is often developed as a hierarchical diagram, but other representations are allowable. The representation must describe the breakdown of the configuration system into subsystems and the lowest manageable level. An accurate and complete structure chart is the key to the determination of the configuration items (CI), and a visual representation of the configuration system and the internal interfaces among its CIs(define CI clearly). During the configuration control process, the structure chart is used to identify CIs and their associated artifacts that a proposed change may impact.

Structure chart construction 
 According to Wolber (2009), "a structure chart can be developed starting with the creating of a structure, which places the root of an upside-down tree which forms the structure chart. The next step is to conceptualize the main sub-tasks that must be performed by the program to solve the problem. Next, the programmer focuses on each sub-task individually, and conceptualizes how each can be broken down into even smaller tasks. Eventually, the program is broken down to a point where the leaves of the tree represent simple methods that can be coded with just a few program statements".

In practice, see figure, first it is checked if a structure chart has been developed already. If so an expert needs to review it to ensure it represents the current structure and if not, updates the chart where needed..

See also 

 Computer-aided software engineering
 System context diagram
 Decomposition diagram
 Function model
 HIPO
 Structured Analysis and Design Technique
 Warnier/Orr diagram
 Work breakdown structure

References

Further reading 
 Sarah Brooks (1981). "Structure Charts and Basic Programming". in: MATYC Journal, v15 n2 p. 107-112 Spring 1981.
 Tom DeMarco (1979). Structured Analysis and System Specification. Prentice Hall.
 Edward Yourdon (1999). Modern Structured Analysis, Yourdon Press Computing Series, 1999,

External links 
 Structure charts Overview.
 State Court Structure Charts, a series of examples.
 Structure Charts (.doc).

Charts
Systems analysis